George Higgins (16 June 1925 – 13 April 1993) was a Scottish professional footballer who played as a full-back.

References

1925 births
1993 deaths
Footballers from Dundee
Scottish footballers
Association football fullbacks
Lochee Harp F.C. players
Blackburn Rovers F.C. players
Bolton Wanderers F.C. players
Grimsby Town F.C. players
Scarborough F.C. players
English Football League players
Scottish football managers
Grimsby Town F.C. managers
Grimsby Town F.C. non-playing staff
English Football League managers